J. Richard "Rick" Capka (born March 16, 1949) was sworn in as the 16th Federal Highway Administrator on May 31, 2006 and served until he resigned on January 24, 2008. Previously, Capka had been appointed the Deputy Administrator of the Federal Highway Administration (FHWA) in August 2002 and was the Acting Administrator since August 2005. In those capacities, he helped to prepare the Bush administration's proposed transportation reauthorization legislation; to shape the management of highway mega-projects and; to develop national programs and initiatives to relieve congestion. He was also the first U.S. Department of Transportation (USDOT) official to deploy to Iraq (2003) and led the highly successful federal response to the tragic 2007 collapse of the I-35 W Bridge in Minneapolis, MN.

Prior to his appointment as Deputy Administrator, Capka served as Chief Executive Officer/Executive Director of the Massachusetts Turnpike Authority (MTA) where he directed the oversight of the $14.6 billion Central Artery/Tunnel project ("Big Dig") in Boston, the largest and most complex infrastructure project of its time in the United States. In that capacity, Capka worked closely with the USDOT Inspector General, the FHWA, and other state agencies to develop and gain approval for the project's complex finance plan. The budget that Capka established in May 2001 remained on target and provided a sound foundation for the project's subsequent financial management.

Prior to his position with the MTA, Capka retired as a brigadier general in early 2001 following a 29-year military career in the U.S. Army Corps of Engineers, where he served in the U.S., Europe, the Pacific and the Far East. His most recent assignments before retirement included division engineer and commander of the U.S. Army Corps of Engineers South Atlantic Division, where he was responsible for managing the corps' activities in the southeastern U.S. and in Central and South America. He also was commander of the South Pacific Division, where he was responsible for the corps' activities in the far western and southwestern U.S. during which time he led the inter-agency efforts to restore California's vast federal flood control system that had been severely damaged following the state's unprecedented floods in 1987. That effort earned specific praise from both the President and Governor of California.

In 2008, he joined Dawson & Associates in Washington, D.C., as chief operating officer. He is a registered professional engineer in Virginia. Capka advises on federal environmental policy involving the U.S. Army Corps of Engineers and the Environmental Protection Agency.

Born to a military family in Tokyo and raised in Maryland, Capka is a 1971 graduate of the United States Military Academy with a Bachelor of Science degree. He later earned a Master of Engineering degree from the University of California, Berkeley in 1977 and an M.B.A. degree from Chaminade University of Honolulu in 1983. Capka is a 1984 graduate of the Army Command and General Staff College and a 1991 graduate of the National War College. His military awards include the Distinguished Service Medal, the Defense Superior Service Medal, the Legion of Merit and four Meritorious Service Medals.

References

1949 births
Living people
United States Military Academy alumni
Military personnel from Maryland
UC Berkeley College of Engineering alumni
Chaminade University of Honolulu alumni
United States Army Command and General Staff College alumni
National War College alumni
Recipients of the Meritorious Service Medal (United States)
Recipients of the Legion of Merit
United States Army generals
Recipients of the Defense Superior Service Medal
Recipients of the Distinguished Service Medal (US Army)
American chief executives
George W. Bush administration personnel
Administrators of the Federal Highway Administration